Françoise Pichard (born 2 November 1941 in Lion-en-Sullias), also known as Chard and Pscharr, is a French far-right political cartoonist and illustrator of children books.

Biography 
Chard has published cartoons in Rivarol since 1967, in Présent since 1982, and in Signal d'Alarme since its foundation in 2006.

On 8 November 1994, she was found guilty and fined the equivalent of approximately €3000 by High Court of France, for complicity in "provoking discrimination, hatred or racial violence" against the black community, for a cartoon published on 4 March of the same year.

On 1 November 2006, she won second place in the Iranian 'International Holocaust Cartoon Competition' with an openly negationist cartoon, in a tie with Carlos Latuff.  According to the Jerusalem Center for Public Affairs, her cartoon contains explicit Holocaust denial. On 3 November 2006, she denied having authorised entry of her cartoon in the competition and refused her prize.

Compilations of political drawings
 As "Chard"
 le Chardnaval de la Ve (drawings published in Rivarol)
 le Chardnaval socialiste (drawings published in Rivarol)
 Chard à la une de Présent (drawings published in Présent)
 Chard... gez ! : Chard 1989-1991 : le combat national en dessins, Éditions Nationales, Paris, 1991, 396 p. 
 20 ans de malheur
 De droite à gauche, 1993-1997 : 215 dessins publiés dans "Rivarol", Éditions des Tuileries, Paris, 1997, 175 p. 
 Sarko prézydent !, Éditions des Tuileries, Paris, 2004, 64 p.

Notes and references 

  dessinsdechard.free.fr

French cartoonists
French women cartoonists
French comics artists
French female comics artists
French children's book illustrators
French women illustrators
Living people
1941 births